Taşkuyu (literally "stone well" in Turkish) may refer to:
Taşkuyu, Samsat, a village in Samsat district of Adıyaman Province, Turkey
Taşkuyu, Tarsus, a village in Tarsus district of Mersin Province, Turkey